Kottivakam is a locality in the south of Chennai in Chennai district in the Indian state of Tamil Nadu. Kottivakkam is included with the Chennai Corporation.

Demographics 
 India census, Kottivakkam had a population of 20,217. Males constitute 10,222 of the population and females 9,995.  India census Kottivakkam has an average literacy rate of 71%, higher than the national average of 59.5%: male literacy is 78%, and female literacy is 64%. In Kottivakkam, 10% of the population is under 6 years of age.

This suburb (near Chennai) extends from the Bay of Bengal (ECR) to Rajiv Gandhi Salai, the IT corridor of the city, thus enjoying a boom in real estate prices.

Kottivakkam has two prominent schools "Nellai Nadar Matric Hr Sec School" and Manthan Vidyashram which is a recent addition

Prominent residents include several IAS officers, judges, and film actors and actresses.

References

Education 

 Vruksha International School of Montessori

Cities and towns in Kanchipuram district
Neighbourhoods in Chennai
Coastal neighbourhoods of Chennai